Eastside Football Club is a soccer club from Issaquah, Washington competing in the Northeast Division of USL League Two. They will begin play in the 2021 USL League Two season.

Eastside FC was founded in 1970 as a youth soccer club. In 2016, they became an affiliate club of Major League Soccer team Seattle Sounders FC. After the 2019 USL League Two season, the Sounders decided to withdraw their U-23 team from the league, where they would be replaced by Eastside FC, who would use their own name and branding, rather than the Sound FC name.

Year-by-year

References

USL League Two teams
1970 establishments in Washington (state)
Issaquah, Washington
Association football clubs established in 1970
Soccer clubs in Washington (state)
Sports in King County, Washington